The Valle Vidal (Spanish, "Valley of Life") is a  mountain basin in the Sangre de Cristo Mountains within the Carson National Forest, northwest of Cimarron, New Mexico. Valle Vidal is noted for its pristine scenery and wildlife. It was protected from oil and gas exploitation by an act of Congress in 2006. The Valle Vidal borders on Vermejo Park Ranch, Philmont Scout Ranch, and other private lands.

History

Valle Vidal was part of the Maxwell Land Grant until purchased by William Bartlett in 1902. Part of the Vermejo Park Ranch, Valle Vidal became a hunting and fishing preserve for wealthy people and celebrities. In 1973, the Vermejo Park Ranch was sold to the Vermejo Park Corporation, a subsidiary of the Pennzoil company. In 1982, Pennzoil donated the Valle Vidal portion of the ranch to the American public and it became part of the Carson National Forest.

The Forest Service declined to reject El Paso's petition despite widespread public opposition to the project. The Coalition for the Valle Vidal was created to oppose mineral leasing and in 2006 the U.S. Congress adopted legislation to prohibit mineral development in the Valle Vidal.

Description

The meadows are surrounded by conifer and quaking aspen forests. The land generally increases in elevation from east to west, culminating in Little Costilla Mountain which rises above timberline. The headwaters of Ponil Creek and Comanche Creek, are in Valle Vidal.

Valle Vidal hosts a herd of about 2,500 elk and other species such black bear, turkey, bobcat, and bison. The bison wander into the valley from Vermejo Park Ranch which has a large free-ranging herd. Comanche Creek, a tributary of Costilla Creek and ultimately the Rio Grande, has a population of rare Rio Grande cutthroat trout.

Recreation

The primary use of Valle Vidal is recreation, hosting outfitters, hunting and trekking guides, backpackers, horseback riders, and fly-fishermen. It contributes $3–5 million every year to local economies supporting dozens of jobs and local industries. New Mexico road 1950 traverses Valle Vidal from east to west.

Cimarron campground has been selected by the Great Outdoor Recreation Pages (GORP) as one of the 10 best campgrounds in the United States. Nearby Shuree ponds offer trout fishing opportunities to children under 12 years of age. Eight miles east of Cimarron is McCrystal Campground. Located in a ponderosa pine forest at the lower elevations of Valle Vidal are several abandoned homesites. Philmont Scout Ranch operates three temporary staffed camps in Valle Vidal. Three thousand Boy Scouts backpack in Valle Vidal each summer.

Valle's Vidal's waters were designated as Outstanding National Resource Waters in December 2005 and McCrystal Creek and North Ponil Creek are eligible for designation as Wild and Scenic Rivers. Most fishing in Valle Vidal is catch and release. Trout in the streams are small but abundant. Elk hunting permits are issued by lottery. To protect wildlife populations the east side of the Valle Vidal is closed from January 1 to March 31 and the west side is closed from May 1 to June 30. When there is a closure on either side of the unit, you may
drive through the whole unit. You cannot get out and hike on the side where the closure is in effect.

References

External links
Carson National Forest: Valle Vidal 
  Valle Vidal at Fourcornersgeotourism.com

Sangre de Cristo Mountains
Carson National Forest
Protected areas of Colfax County, New Mexico
Protected areas of Taos County, New Mexico
Philmont Scout Ranch